Thermal ellipsoids, more formally termed atomic displacement parameters or anisotropic displacement parameters, are ellipsoids used in crystallography to indicate the magnitudes and directions of the thermal vibration of atoms in crystal structures. Since the vibrations are usually anisotropic (different magnitudes in different directions in space), an ellipsoid is a convenient way of visualising the vibration and therefore the symmetry and time averaged position of an atom in a crystal. Their theoretical framework was introduced by D. W. J. Cruickshank in 1956 and the concept was popularized through the program ORTEP (Oak Ridge Thermal-Ellipsoid Plot Program), first released in 1965.

Thermal ellipsoids can be defined by a tensor, a mathematical object which allows the definition of magnitude and orientation of vibration with respect to three mutually perpendicular axes. The size of the ellipsoid is scaled so that it occupies the space in which there is a particular probability of finding the electron density of the atom. The particular probability is usually 50%.

See also
 Debye–Waller factor

References

Crystallography